The 1967 European Ladies' Team Championship took place 4–9 July at Penina Golf and Resort in Portimão, Algarve, Portugal. It was the fifth women's golf amateur European Ladies' Team Championship.

Venue 

The championship course, designed by Sir Henry Cotton and situated on the south coast of Portugal, 180 kilometres south of the capital of the country, Lisbon, was set up with par 75.

It was warm and sunny during the tournament.

Format 
All participating teams played two qualification rounds of stroke play, counting the three best scores out of up to four players for each team. The four best teams formed flight A. The next four teams formed flight B and the last four teams formed flight C.

The winner in each flight was determined by a round-robin system. All teams in the flight met each other and the team with most points for team matches in flight A won the tournament, using the scale, win=2 points, halved=1 point, lose=0 points. In each match between two nation teams, two foursome games and four single games were played.

Teams 
A record number of twelve nation teams contested the event. Ireland, a combined team from Northern Ireland and the Republic of Ireland, took part for the first time. Each team consisted of a minimum of four players.

Players in the leading teams

Other participating teams

Winners 
Defending champions team England won the championship, earning 6 points in flight A.

Individual winner in the opening 36-hole stroke play qualifying competition was Odile Garaialde Semelaigne, France, with a score of 1-under-par 149.

Results 
Qualification round

Team standings

Individual leaders

 Note: There was no official recognition for the lowest individual score.

Flight A

Team matches

Team standings

Final standings

Sources:

See also 
 Espirito Santo Trophy – biennial world amateur team golf championship for women organized by the International Golf Federation.
 European Amateur Team Championship – European amateur team golf championship for men organised by the European Golf Association.

References

External links 
 European Golf Association: Results

European Ladies' Team Championship
Golf tournaments in Portugal
European Ladies' Team Championship
European Ladies' Team Championship
European Ladies' Team Championship